Tetragonoderus cursor is a species of beetle in the family Carabidae. It was described by Henry Walter Bates in 1886.

References

cursor
Beetles described in 1886